The Riera de Merlès is a small river that passes through the comarques of Osona, Bages, and Berguedà. It is formed by the confluence of several small mountain creeks and torrents that descend the Rasos de Tubau, in the municipalities of Sant Jaume de Frontanyà and Les Llosses.

Historically, the Merlès marked several administrative frontiers. These include the ancient counties of Berga and Osona, the dioceses of Solsona and Vic, and the modern comarques of Berguedà and Lluçanès.

References

Rivers of Spain
Rivers of Catalonia